The Syracuse Stone Railroad, incorporated in Syracuse, New York, on May 13, 1836, was granted approval by the State to build a road from Syracuse to local quarries in Onondaga, New York.

The road was chartered on the same day as the Syracuse and Onondaga Railroad which was organized for the same purpose and completed on October 16, 1838. The Syracuse Stone Railroad was abandoned before construction was even started and was consolidated into the Syracuse and Onondaga Railroad.

References

Defunct railroads in Syracuse, New York
Defunct New York (state) railroads
Railway companies established in 1836
1836 establishments in New York (state)